The Hulodini are a tribe of moths in the family Erebidae.

Taxonomy
The tribe may be most closely related to the tribe Ercheiini, also within the Erebinae.

Genera

Ericeia
Hulodes
Lacera
Speiredonia

References

 
Erebinae
Moth tribes